Crowned Prince (foaled 31 January 1969) was a Kentucky-bred, British-trained Thoroughbred racehorse who was sold for a world-record $510,000 ($ million inflation adjusted) in 1970. In a brief racing career he established himself as the leading British juvenile of his generation in 1971 with win in the Group Two Champagne Stakes and the Group One Dewhurst Stakes. He was retired from racing after a single, unsuccessful start in the following spring and had little success as a breeding stallion.

Background
Crowned Prince was a chestnut horse with a white star  and white socks on his hind feet bred in Kentucky by Leslie Combs II of Spendthrift Farm and Frank McMahon. He was sired by Raise a Native, an American racehorse who was unbeaten in four races and was named American Champion Two-Year-Old Colt by Turf and Sports Digest in 1963. Crowned Prince's dam Gay Hostess was a highly-successful broodmare, having produced Majestic Prince from a previous coverings by Raise a Native. Her other descendants have included Real Quiet, Caracolero and The Derby winner Secreto.

At the Keeneland Sales in July 1970 the yearling was sold for a then world-recond price of $510,000, breaking the record set two years earlier by the filly Reine Enchanteur, with McMahon buying out his partner Combs. Majestic Prince had previously held the record as well as the other Spendthrift graduates One Bold Bid and Bold Discovery.

The colt was sent into training with Bernard Van Cutsem at his Stanley House stable at Newmarket, Suffolk. At the time, Van Cutsem was one of the most successful trainers in Britain, handling major winners including Park Top (King George VI and Queen Elizabeth Stakes) and Karabas (Washington, D.C. International Stakes).

Racing career
As a two-year-old in 1972, Crowned Prince was a member of an exceptional team of juveniles trained by Van Cutsem which also include High Top and Sharpen Up. Crowned Prince won two of his three races. At Doncaster Racecourse in September he contested the Champagne Stakes over seven furlongs. Ridden by Lester Piggott he started the 11/10 favourite and won from the Barry Hills-trained Rheingold. In the Dewhurst Stakes at Newmarket Racecourse a month later he was matched against Rheingold and won by five lengths at odds of 4/9.

In the following year hear he finished fourth in the Craven Stakes after which he was found to have developed a soft palate problem and was retired from racing.

Assessment
There was no International Classification of European two-year-olds in 1971: the official handicappers of Britain, Ireland and France compiled separate rankings for horses which competed in those countries. In the British Free Handicap, Crowned Prince was the best two-year-old of the season by a two-pound margin from his stable companion High Top. The independent Timeform organisation, however, rated him six pounds inferior to Deep Diver.

Stud record
As a breeding stallion, Crowned Prince stood in Ireland before being exported to Japan.

Pedigree

References

1969 racehorse births
Racehorses bred in Kentucky
Racehorses trained in the United Kingdom
Thoroughbred family 4-d